Scott Murray is an Australian filmmaker and writer, best known for his long association with Cinema Papers and making the film Devil in the Flesh (1989).

References

External links

Articles written at Senses of Cinema

Living people
Year of birth missing (living people)
Australian film directors